Queensway Secondary School (QSS) is a co-educational government secondary school in Queenstown, Singapore. It offers a four to five-year course leading to the Singapore-Cambridge GCE Ordinary Level or Singapore-Cambridge GCE Normal Level examinations.

History
QSS was officially opened by Lim Teck Hin, Member of Parliament for Tiong Bahru, on 2 September 1961. It was the first school to have a hall built for badminton.

The development of school followed the growth of Queenstown. By 1963, the school had 36 classes and 50 teachers. It then became a two-session school. In 1975, two new classroom blocks were built to cater to the increased enrolment. In addition, a Science Laboratory, a Home Economics Room, AVA and Music rooms and an enlarged canteen were built.

In 2000, Queensway accepted students from Mei Chin Secondary School, which had closed down, and had also merged with Buona Vista Secondary School in January 2001.

The school has since undergone a rebuilding programme in 1999 and the new campus was completed on the same historical site in December 2001. The new Indoor Sports Hall and Atrium was completed in July 2009 and officially opened by Baey Yam Keng, Member of Parliament for Tanjong Pagar GRC, on 15 April 2011.

Notable alumni
 Shigga Shay, musician and rapper
 Shaiful Esah, national footballer

References

Secondary schools in Singapore
Queenstown, Singapore
Schools in Central Region, Singapore